Sveta Marija is a village and a municipality in Međimurje County, Croatia. It is located in the south-eastern part of the county, near the Drava River, approximately 27 kilometres south-east of Čakovec and 11 kilometres east of Prelog, the largest and second-largest city of Međimurje County respectively.

The municipality consists of two villages – Sveta Marija and Donji Mihaljevec. It was established in 1997, prior to which the two villages belonged to the municipality of Kotoriba. In the 2011 census, the municipality had a population of 2,317, with 1,594 people living in Sveta Marija and the remaining 723 in Donji Mihaljevec at the time. The majority of the population identified themselves as Croats during the census.

References

Municipalities of Croatia
Populated places in Međimurje County